Argyresthia media is a moth of the family Yponomeutidae. It is found in North America, including Ohio.

The wingspan is about 9 mm. The forewings are silvery white, the costal edge suffused with pale golden. There are dark bronzy brown markings. The hindwings are pale fuscous.

Adults were captured in a clump of willow trees, on the trunk of one of which it was resting. The host plant is unknown.

References

Moths described in 1914
Argyresthia
Moths of North America